Aleksandr Komlev (born 26 June 1994) is a Belarusian professional footballer who plays for Osipovichi.

Honours
Dinamo Brest
Belarusian Cup winner: 2016–17

References

External links 
 
 

1994 births
Living people
Belarusian footballers
Association football forwards
FC Dinamo Minsk players
FC Bereza-2010 players
FC Energetik-BGU Minsk players
FC Minsk players
FC Vitebsk players
FC Lida players
FC Dynamo Brest players
FC Smolevichi players
FC Osipovichi players